Retreat Rosenwald School, also known as the Retreat Colored School, is a historic Rosenwald School located at Westminster, Oconee County, South Carolina. 

It was built in 1924, and is a one-story,  T-shaped, two-teacher community school. The building has three main rooms consisting of two classrooms and an industrial room in the forward-projecting wing.  The school closed in 1950.

It was added to the National Register of Historic Places in 2011.

References

School buildings on the National Register of Historic Places in South Carolina
Defunct schools in South Carolina
1924 establishments in South Carolina
Educational institutions established in 1924
African-American history of South Carolina
Rosenwald schools in South Carolina
Schools in Oconee County, South Carolina
National Register of Historic Places in Oconee County, South Carolina